Comfortlessbreen is a glacier in Oscar II Land at Spitsbergen, Svalbard. It has a length of about fourteen kilometers, and a maximum width of three kilometers. The glacier debouches into Engelskbukta, after a merge with Uvêrsbreen. Comfortlessbreen is separated from Uvêrsbreen by the mountain range of Trondheimfjella (with Domkyrkja in the west).

References 

Glaciers of Spitsbergen